Stillinge Strand is a village on Zealand, Denmark. It is located in Slagelse Municipality. The name of the village translates to 'Stillinge Beach', and a sizable beach of the same name borders the village.

References

Cities and towns in Region Zealand
Slagelse Municipality
Villages in Denmark